Efraín Antonio Araneda Estay (born 5 June 1978 in Peñalolén), also known as Chico, is a Chilean-born naturalized Tahitian (French) football manager and former footballer, who played for Tahiti national team.

International goals

International career statistics

Managerial career
After his retirement, he became the manager of Central Sport.

Personal life
His son, Diego, is a footballer who has represented Tahiti U20.

In addition to his work as a football coach, he performs as a tour guide.

Honours

Player

Club
AS Dragon
 Tahiti Ligue 1 (1): 2012–13

International
Tahiti
 OFC Nations Cup (1): 2012

Manager
Central Sport
 Tahiti Ligue 1 (1): 2017–18

References

External links

Efraín Araneda at playmakerstats.com (English version of ceroacero.es)

1978 births
Living people
Footballers from Santiago
Chilean footballers
Chilean emigrants to France
People with acquired French citizenship
Naturalized citizens of France
French Polynesian footballers
Tahiti international footballers
C.S. Visé players
Deportes Colchagua footballers
A.S. Pirae players
Primera B de Chile players
Tercera División de Chile players 
Challenger Pro League players
Chilean expatriate footballers
Expatriate footballers in Belgium
Chilean expatriate sportspeople in Belgium 
Expatriate footballers in French Polynesia 
Association football midfielders
French Polynesian football managers